Alberto Uría (11 July 1924 – 4 December 1988), was a racing driver from Uruguay.  He participated in two Formula One World Championship Grands Prix, debuting on 16 January 1955. He entered two Argentine Grand Prix races as a privateer running a Maserati. He scored no championship points, his best finish being a shared sixth place with Oscar Gonzalez in 1956.

Complete Formula One World Championship results
(key) 

* Indicates shared drive with Oscar González

External links
 Profile on OldRacingCars

Uruguayan racing drivers
Uruguayan Formula One drivers
1924 births
1988 deaths